On November 18, 1997, Major League Baseball (MLB) held an expansion draft to allow two  expansion teams, the Arizona Diamondbacks and the Tampa Bay Devil Rays, to build their rosters prior to debuting in the National League West and American League East divisions, respectively, in the 1998 MLB season. The draft took place in the Phoenix Civic Center in Phoenix, Arizona.

Background

Following the success of the 1993 expansion, which added the Colorado Rockies and Florida Marlins, MLB in 1994 set up an expansion committee to add two expansion teams. Tampa Bay and Phoenix were chosen for the two expansion franchises.

Procedures
Similar to the 1992 expansion draft, both expansion teams selected 35 players. The draft was divided into three rounds. Each team would select 14 players in round 1, 14 players in round 2, and 7 players in round 3. Tampa Bay general manager Chuck LaMar and Arizona general manager Joe Garagiola Jr. oversaw their teams' selections.

The Devil Rays and Diamondbacks could pick any player not on the protected lists of the 28 other teams, although no team could lose more than one player in a given round. The protected list for each team consisted of:
For the first round, 15 players from the rosters of their entire organization—both their 40-man roster, plus all minor league affiliates.
Each team could add three more players to its protected list after each round.
All players in an organization were eligible to be drafted, except those with no prior major league experience who had less than three years service if signed at age 19 or older, or had less than four years of service if signed at age 18 or younger.
Players who were free agents after the end of the 1997 season need not be protected.

As with the 1992 expansion draft, the order was determined by a coin toss. The winner of the toss could choose either: (a) The first overall pick in the expansion draft or (b) allow the other team to pick first and receive both the second and third overall expansion draft picks and the right to pick first in the subsequent rounds of the expansion draft. Arizona won the toss and chose to select second.

Results
The Devil Rays reportedly considered trading the player they were to select first. They chose Tony Saunders from the Florida Marlins.

Note, each noted All-Star player achieved that status in later season(s).

Post-draft trades

Once the draft was completed a number of trades were made. Teams had to wait until after the draft or risk losing their newly acquired players because they were not on their protected lists.

The Devil Rays traded Bobby Abreu to the Philadelphia Phillies for Kevin Stocker
The Devil Rays traded Andy Sheets and Brian Boehringer to the San Diego Padres for John Flaherty
The Devil Rays traded Dmitri Young to the Cincinnati Reds for Mike Kelly
The Devil Rays purchased Fred McGriff from the Atlanta Braves
The Diamondbacks traded Gabe Alvarez, Joe Randa, and Matt Drews to the Detroit Tigers for Travis Fryman
The Diamondbacks traded Scott Winchester to the Cincinnati Reds for Félix Rodríguez
The Diamondbacks traded Jesus Martinez to the Florida Marlins for Devon White
The Diamondbacks traded Chuck McElroy to the Colorado Rockies for Harvey Pulliam

Aftermath
The Diamondbacks intended to spend money. The day prior to the expansion draft, they signed Jay Bell to a $34 million contract across five years. Two weeks following the draft, the Diamondbacks traded Fryman and Martin for Matt Williams.

The Devil Rays and Diamondbacks had differing results in their first years in MLB. Both teams altered their initial plans of developing youth; the Devil Rays acquired future Hall of Famer Wade Boggs and pitcher Wilson Alvarez along with sluggers Jose Canseco, Vinny Castilla, and Greg Vaughn while the Diamondbacks added Randy Johnson, Curt Schilling, Luis Gonzalez, Todd Stottlemyre, Steve Finley, Armando Reynoso, Greg Swindell, Tony Womack, Mark Grace, Reggie Sanders, Craig Counsell and Greg Colbrunn. While the Devil Rays consistently finished last in the AL East for the next decade, the Diamondbacks won the 2001 World Series.

References

External links

Expansion draft
Expansion draft
Major League Baseball expansion drafts
Expansion Draft
Major League Baseball expansion draft
Major League Baseball expansion draft
1990s in Phoenix, Arizona
Baseball in Arizona
Sports in Phoenix, Arizona
Events in Phoenix, Arizona